Belluschi is an Italian surname, derived from the adjective bello ("beautiful"). Notable people with the surname include:

Fernando Belluschi (born 1983), Argentine  footballer
Pietro Belluschi (1899–1994), Italian-American architect

References

See also
Bellucci

Italian-language surnames

he:בלוצ'י